Qualification runs of the Women's 200 metre breaststroke at the 1958 European Aquatics Championships  were held on 1 September. Final competition took place on 2 September. There were 16 participants.

Records

There was a new record during the competition:

Results

Qualifications

Final

Sources

1958 in sports